Sierra Madre (Spanish, 'mother mountain range') may refer to:

Places and mountains

Mexico 
Sierra Madre Occidental, a mountain range in northwestern Mexico and southern Arizona
Sierra Madre Oriental, a mountain range in northeastern Mexico
Sierra Madre de Oaxaca, a mountain range in south-central Mexico
Sierra Madre del Sur, a mountain range in southern Mexico
Sierra Madre de Chiapas, a mountain range which extends from southeastern Mexico

Central America 
Sierra Madre de Chiapas, the continuation of this mountain range crossing southern Guatemala, northern El Salvador, and western Honduras

Philippines 
Sierra Madre (Philippines), a mountain range on Luzon island

United States 
Sierra Madre Mountains (California), a mountain range in the state of California
 Sierra Madre Fault Zone, at the boundary to the San Gabriel Valley and San Fernando Valley
1991 Sierra Madre earthquake
Sierra Madre, California, a town in Los Angeles County located at the foot of the San Gabriel Mountains
Sierra Madre Boulevard
Sierra Madre Villa station, Los Angeles Metro Rail L line station.
Sierra Madre Line, a former railway line
Sierra Madre Range (Wyoming), a mountain range in the south central portion of the state

Other uses 
Sierra Madre sparrow, Xenospiza baileyi, an endangered American bird
Sierra Madre ground squirrel, Callospermophilus madrensis, a species of rodent 
 Sierra Madre Casino, a fictional location in the Fallout: New Vegas video game
 BRP Sierra Madre (LT-57), a Philippine navy ship formerly USS Harnett County (LST-821), deliberately run aground on the Spratly Islands

See also 
 Sierra (disambiguation)
 The Treasure of the Sierra Madre, a 1927 novel
 The Treasure of the Sierra Madre (film), 1948 film made from the novel